The Zeitun Resistance by the Armenian militia against the Ottoman Empire may refer to:
First Zeitun Resistance of 1862
Zeitun Rebellion in 1895–1896
Second Zeitun Resistance. 1915